Palmitoylcarnitine is an ester derivative of carnitine involved in the metabolism of fatty acids. During the tricarboxylic acid cycle (TCA), fatty acids undergo a process known as β-oxidation to produce energy in the form of ATP. β-oxidation occurs primarily within mitochondria, however the mitochondrial membrane prevents the entry of long chain fatty acids (>C10), so the conversion of fatty acids such as palmitic acid is key. Palmitic acid is brought to the cell and once inside the cytoplasm is first converted to Palmitoyl-CoA. Palmitoyl-CoA has the ability to freely pass the outer mitochondrial membrane, but the inner membrane is impermeable to the Acyl-CoA and thioester forms of various long-chain fatty acids such as palmitic acid. The palmitoyl-CoA is then enzymatically transformed into palmitoylcarnitine via the Carnitine O-palmitoyltransferase family. The palmitoylcarnitine is then actively transferred into the inner membrane of the mitochondria via the carnitine-acylcarnitine translocase. Once inside the inner mitochondrial membrane, the same Carnitine O-palmitoyltransferase family is then responsible for transforming the palmitoylcarnitine back to the palmitoyl-CoA form.

Structure 

Palmitoylcarnitine contains the saturated fatty acid known as palmitic acid (C16:0) which is bound to the β-hydroxy group of the carnitine. The core carnitine structure, consisting of butanoate with a quaternary ammonium attached to C4 and hydroxy group at C3, is a common molecular backbone for the transfer of multiple long chain fatty acids in the TCA cycle.

Function

Energy Generation 
Palmitoylcarnitine is one molecule in a family of ester derivatives of carnitine that are utilized in the TCA cycle to generate energy. The beta oxidation yields 7 NADH, 7 FADH2, and 8 Acetyl-CoA chains. This Acetyl-CoA generates 3 NADH, 1 FADH2, and 1 GTP for every molecule in the Kreb's cycle. Each NADH generates 2.5 ATP in the ETC and FADH2 generates 1.5 ATP. This totals to 108 ATP, but 2 ATP are consumed to generate the initial Palmitoyl-CoA, leaving a net gain of 106 ATP.

Clinical Significance 
Palmitoylcarnitine has demonstrated potential as a diagnostic marker in newborns for the medical condition of primary carnitine deficiency.

Levels of palmitoylarnitinte (palcar) demonstrated significant correlation with dihydrotestosterone (DHT) and its effects in prostate cancer models, suggesting a similar role between the two molecules.

See also
 Carnitine O-palmitoyltransferase

References 

Metabolism
Lipids